Principles of Information Security is a textbook written by Michael Whitman and Herbert Mattord and published by Course Technology.

It is in widespread use in higher education in the United States as well as in many English-speaking countries.

Editions

First edition 
The initial edition of this text was published in 2002.

Second edition 
The second edition was published in 2004.

Third edition 
The third edition was published in 2008. The bound text contained 550 pages.

Fourth edition 
Publication Date: January 1, 2011; Authors: Michael E. Whitman, Herbert J. Mattord.

Fifth edition 
Publication date: November 18, 2014; Authors: Michael E. Whitman, Herbert J. Mattord.

Sixth edition 
Publication Date: January 2018; Authors: Michael E. Whitman, Herbert J. Mattord.

Seventh edition 
Publication Date: July 2021; Authors: Michael E. Whitman, Herbert J. Mattord.

Authors 
 Michael E. Whitmam, Ph.D., CISM, CISSP.
Herbert J. Mattord, CISM, CISSP.

Other book projects
Whitman, M. E. & Mattord, H. J., Hands-On Information Security Lab Manual, 3rd ed. © 2009 Course Technology, Boston, MA, 
Whitman, M. E. & Mattord, H. J., Principles of Incident Response and Disaster Recovery, © 2006 Course Technology, Boston, MA, 
Whitman, M. E. & Mattord, H., Management of Information Security, 3rd ed. © 2010 Course Technology, Boston, MA, Note that this text has been adopted at over 100 institutions globally and is recommended by ASIS as a means to prepare for the CPP certification examination
Whitman, M. E. & Mattord, H., Management of Information Security, 2nd ed. © 2007 Course Technology, Boston, MA,  
Whitman, M. E. & Mattord, H.J., Management of Information Security, © 2004 Course Technology, Boston, MA,  
Whitman, M. E., and Mattord, H. J., Guide to Firewalls and VPNs  © 2011 Course Technology, Boston, MA, contract pending
Whitman, M.E. & Mattord, H. J., Readings and Cases in the Management of Information Security, © 2005 Course Technology, Boston, MA, 
Whitman, M.E. & Mattord, H. J., Readings and Cases in the Management of Information Security: Law & Ethics, © 2009 Course Technology, Boston, MA, 

Dr. Whitman and Professor Mattord, working with others have collaborated on the following projects:
Whitman, M. E., Shackleford, D. & Mattord, H.J., Hands-On Information Security Lab Manual, 2nd ed. © 2005 Course Technology, Boston, MA, 
Whitman, M. E., Mattord, H. J., & Austin, R.D., Guide to Firewalls and Network Security: Intrusion Detection and VPNs  © 2009 Course Technology, Boston, MA,

External links 
 http://www.cengage.com/cengage/instructor.do?disciplinenumber=412&product_isbn=9781423901778
http://www.amazon.com/Principles-Information-Security-Michael-Whitman/dp/1423901770/ref=sr_1_2?ie=UTF8&s=books&qid=1268755675&sr=8-2

References 

Cengage books
Information Security, Principles of